Southwind Passage is a navigable passage between Betbeder Islands and Dickens Rocks, located at the north extremity of the Biscoe Islands. Named by Captain Sumner R. Dolber, USCG, commander of the USCGC 1967–68 season.

Straits of the Biscoe Islands